Bitter Fruit is a 2001 novel by Achmat Dangor

Books
Bitter Fruit (poem), 1937 poem by Abel Meeropol in The New York Teacher, base of the Billie Holiday song "Strange Fruit"
Bitter Fruit, The Story of the American Coup in Guatemala Stephen Schlesinger 1982
Bitter Fruit, collection of stories by Sa'adat Hasan Manto

Film and TV
Bitter Fruit (1920 film), American silent film 
Bitter Fruit (1967 film) (Fruits amers), French film directed by Jacqueline Audry
"Bitter Fruit" 1993 Season 2 Episode 12 of Street Justice (1991 TV Series)
"Bitter Fruit" 1995 Season 6 Episode 1 of Law & Order (1990 TV Series)
"A Bitter Fruit" 1998 Season 1 Episode 38 of Tokyo Pig (1997 TV Series)
Bitter Fruits (Gorki plodovi) 2008 Serbian TV Series Predrag Miletić

Music
"Bitter Fruit", single by Steven Van Zandt from Freedom – No Compromise
"Bitter Fruit", song by The Kills from Ash & Ice
"Bitter Fruit", song by Blue Rodeo from The Days In Between 
"Bitter Fruit", song by Billie Myers from Vertigo